Halisson Bruno Melo dos Santos (born 28 June 1985), simply known as Halisson, is a Brazilian footballer who plays as a central defender.

References

External links

1985 births
Living people
People from Bauru
Brazilian footballers
Association football defenders
Santos FC players
Ipatinga Futebol Clube players
Associação Portuguesa de Desportos players
Mogi Mirim Esporte Clube players
Esporte Clube Santo André players
Esporte Clube Noroeste players
Oeste Futebol Clube players
Botafogo Futebol Clube (SP) players
Liga I players
ASA 2013 Târgu Mureș players
Primeira Liga players
Gil Vicente F.C. players
Tupynambás Futebol Clube players
Brazilian expatriate footballers
Brazilian expatriate sportspeople in Romania
Expatriate footballers in Romania
Brazilian expatriate sportspeople in Portugal
Expatriate footballers in Portugal
Footballers from São Paulo (state)